Peter Barcroft (14 August 1929 – 26 August 1977) was an English cricketer who played three first-class matches for  Lancashire County Cricket Club in the 1956 season. He played for Lancashire's second-eleven between 1952 and 1961, as well as playing for Bacup Cricket Club between 1946 and 1965.

References

1929 births
1977 deaths
English cricketers
Lancashire cricketers
People from Bacup